Gunnarskog or Stommen is a locality situated in Arvika Municipality, Värmland County, Sweden with 290 inhabitants in 2010.

Skramlestenen
Skramlestenen or The Skramle Stone is an old Runestone found in 1990.

References 

Populated places in Värmland County
Populated places in Arvika Municipality